Görkem Yeltan (born 17 January 1977) is a Turkish actress. She appeared in more than fifteen films since 1993.

Selected filmography

References

External links 

1977 births
Living people
Turkish film actresses